Bubanza is one of the 18 provinces of Burundi.

Communes
It is divided administratively into 5 communes:

 Commune of Bubanza (Bubanza)
 Commune of Gihanga (Gihanga)
 Commune of Musigati (Musigati)
 Commune of Mpanda (Mpanda)
 Commune of Rugazi (Rugazi)

References

 
Provinces of Burundi